Mylabris orientalis, is a species of blister beetle found in India and Sri Lanka.

Description
Body length is about 27.4 mm. Head and pronotum with moderately coarse deep and dense punctures. Eyes longer and reniform. Pubescence in pronotum long and dense. Elytra with moderately coarse, shallow, very dense punctures. Ventrum moderately coarsely punctate and shiny. Male has deeply emarginate sixth visible abdominal sternum, in which female is emarginate.

References

Meloidae
Insects of Sri Lanka
Insects of India
Insects described in 1872